Borstahusens BK is a Swedish football club located in Borstahusen, Landskrona.

Background
The club was founded on 20 January 1922 at a meeting at Borstahusen. By the 1930s the club used the name Borstahusens BK and Borstahusens IF but in the 1960s the title IK Atleten was used. In 1969 the club played at its highest level in Division 2 Södra Götaland, which at that time was the second tier of Swedish football. Following relegation at the end of the 1969 season the club changed their name back to Borstahusens BK.

Borstahusens BK currently plays in Division 4 Skåne Nordvästra which is the sixth tier of Swedish football. They play their home matches at the Ulkavallen IP in Landskrona. The former Landskrona BoIS, AFC Ajax, and Sweden youth international Måns Sörensson spent the 2012 and 2013 seasons with the club.

The club is affiliated to Skånes Fotbollförbund.

Season to season

IK Atleten competed in the following divisions in the 1960s:

In the next two decades Borstahusens BK competed in the following divisions:

In recent seasons Borstahusens BK have competed in the following divisions:

Footnotes

External links
 Borstahusens BK – Official website
 Borstahusens BK on Facebook

Football clubs in Landskrona
Football clubs in Skåne County
1922 establishments in Sweden